Marabou is a Swedish and Norwegian chocolate brand owned by Mondelez International.

History
 

The brand was founded by the Norwegian chocolatier Johan Throne Holst (1868–1946), who already had launched the same chocolate recipe in Norway under the name Freia with great success – in the beginning of the 20th century Freia owned over 50% of the Norwegian market. During the First World War, the continental European markets were closed, so the company decided to expand to Sweden.

In 1916, the brand Marabou was created in Sweden; as the name Freja was already taken in Sweden, the company decided to name their Swedish branch after the stork in the logo. However, the actual production didn't start until 1919 due to shortages in cocoa supply caused by World War I.

Throne Holst's second son, Henning, took over Sweden's first chocolate factory in Sundbyberg, just north of Stockholm, in 1918. The first Marabou chocolate to be established was milk chocolate (Mjölkchoklad), which was produced using the same recipe as Freia. From the mid-1950s on, Marabou chocolate was caramelized, which significantly changed its taste. Over time, the Sundbyberg factory was not sufficient for the growing demand, so in the 1970s, production moved, after 60 years in one location, to newly built premises in Upplands Väsby, where it remains today.

At the end of the 1960s, the symbol of Marabou was changed from a stork to the rounded “M” in the company logo. It was designed by Sigvard Bernadotte. This also marked the beginning of the first commercials starring Yvonne Lombard who created the slogan "Mmm... Marabou!". Marabou chocolate is widely available in Sweden in assorted varieties.

Freia and Marabou later merged, and, in 1993, were purchased by Kraft Foods for 3 billion Norwegian kroner. Marabou chocolate is available in a number of European countries and was until September 2011 sold by IKEA in Canada, Israel, and Poland. Marabou chocolate is sold by IKEA in Australia, Austria, Canada, Czechia, Germany, Hungary, Japan, the Netherlands, Portugal, Russia, Serbia, Slovakia, Spain, Switzerland, Taiwan, Turkey, the UAE, the UK, Iceland and the US.

Marabou has a Royal warrant of appointment from the King of Sweden.

Controversies 
In 2013, there was press coverage about Marabou's use of palm oil, which, according to Greenpeace, has a negative effect on the animals and people of the world's rain forests. According to the Marabou website (in 2020), Marabou milk chocolate (Mjölkchoklad) does not contain palm oil, but some other products of the company do. The company claims to cover their palm oil demands from  a RSPO-certified system since 2013.

References

External links 

Norwegian chocolate companies
Food and drink companies of Sweden
Swedish brands
Mondelez International brands